Jackie Chan Adventures is an American animated television series, created by John Rogers, Duane Capizzi and Jeff Kline, and produced by Sony Pictures Television (originally as Columbia TriStar Television for the first three seasons). The cartoon series premiered on September 9, 2000, and ran for five seasons until its conclusion on July 8, 2005. The series focuses on a fictionalized version of Hong Kong action film star Jackie Chan, who operates in life as an archaeologist and special agent, combatting threats that are mainly magical and supernatural  based on real-life mythologies and supernatural stories from Asia and around the world  with the aid of his family and close friends.

Many of the episodes created for Jackie Chan Adventures featured references to Chan's actual works, with the actor making live-action appearances in the form of an interview situation, answering questions about his life and work. The series was aired in the United States on Kids' WB, with re-runs aired on Toon Disney's Jetix programming block, as well as Cartoon Network. The series proved a success on children's television, including abroad, leading to the creation of a toy franchise and two video games based on the series.

Premise 
Jackie Chan Adventures is set within an alternate Earth in which magic and supernatural forces exist but are unknown to much of humanity - these include demons, ghosts, spirits, spells and various creatures and gods. Although the series focuses mostly on those from Asia, primarily Chinese mythology and folklore, it also includes those from other locations in the world, including Europe and Central America. In the animated series, the actor Jackie Chan exists in this setting as a professional archaeologist with a high degree of martial combat skill, who is forced to accept the fact that magic and the supernatural exists when he uncovers a talisman in an artifact that possess magical powers sought out by a criminal organization.

Throughout the series, Chan is aided by his close family, including his uncle and his niece Jade, and his close friend Captain Black  head of a secret law enforcement organization codenamed "Section 13"  alongside additional allies introduced over the course of the series. Each season of the program primarily contains an overarching storyline in which Chan and his allies must face off against a dangerous demonic figure, aided by human henchman, by preventing them finding a series of magical objects that can help them to conquer the world. Alongside the overarching plotline, some episodes also consist of standalone stories that focus on Chan and his friends combatting magical and supernatural forces that are either evil or not understanding of their situation. While storylines feature action sequences focused on magic and martial arts, they also include comedic situations akin to several of Chan's works in action-comedy films.

While Chan does not provide the voice of his animated character, he appears regularly in live-action inserts at the end of the program to offer insights on Chinese history, culture and philosophy.

References to Jackie Chan's career 
The series often features references to Jackie Chan's films and his own life throughout the series. In the episode "A Night at the Opera", Uncle states that he was part of the stage group "Seven Little Fortunes", which Jackie Chan was actually part of in real life. Another example is in the episode "The Invisible Mom" where Jackie is bitten by a Snake, and uses a kung fu style known as "the drunken master" from one of his earliest headlining films of the same name. According to Jackie during one of his question segments, the characters of the show are based on certain people in his life. Uncle is based on his agent and father, Jade is based on an assortment of his nieces, and Tohru is based on one of his stunt team members as well as himself. The episode "And He Does His Own Stunts" is a reference to the fact that Jackie Chan does his own stunts in his movies.

Some episodes' titles are based on actual film names. For example, "Half a Mask of Kung Fu" is based on Half a Loaf of Kung Fu, four episode titles ("Enter the Viper", "Enter the Cat", "Re-Enter the J-Team", and "Re-Enter the Dragon") are based on Enter the Dragon (in which Jackie Chan performs as a stuntman), "Shanghai Moon" is based on Shanghai Noon, "Armor of the Gods" is based on Armour of God, "Project A, For Astral" is based on Project A and "Rumble in the Big House" is based on Rumble in the Bronx.

Episodes

Cast 

 James Sie as Jackie Chan  a fictionalized version of the film actor, who is portrayed as a talented archaeologist and skilled martial artist.
 Sie also voices the characters of Chow and Shendu  the latter being the main antagonist in the first two seasons, and then a recurring character in later seasons.
 Stacie Chan as Jade Chan, the niece of Jackie from Hong Kong, China. 
 Lucy Liu also voices the character's future self in a number of episodes.
 Sab Shimono as Uncle, an elderly antique shop-owner and a Chi Wizard. 
 Noah Nelson as Tohru.
 Clancy Brown as Captain Augustus Black.
 Brown also voices the character of Ratso.
 Miguel Sandoval as El Toro Fuerte.
 Julian Sands as Valmont  a secondary antagonist in season 1 & 2.
 Andrew Ableson later voiced the character for recurring appearances in season 3 & 4.
 Franco Velez as Paco.
 Susan Eisenberg as Viper.
 Adam Baldwin as Finn.
 John DiMaggio as Hak Foo.
 Jim Cummings originally voiced the character in their initial appearances in the first season, before script-writers elevated the character's role in the series.
 James Hong as Daolon Wong  the main antagonist in the third season, while a recurring character in season 2 & 4.
 Miguel Ferrer as Tarakudo  the main antagonist in season four.
 Michael Rosenbaum as Drago  initially introduced in season 4, before being written as the main antagonist in season 5.
 Mike Erwin as Strikemaster Ice  recurring character in season five, after initially appearing in the previous season.
 Jeff Fischer as MC Cobra  recurring character in season five, after initially appearing in the previous season.
 Jackie Chan as himself  appears in live-action sequences at the end of episodes to answer questions on Chinese culture and history, as well as his career and personal life.

Release

Broadcast 
The series aired in the Republic of Ireland on RTÉ Two from 30 April 2001 and was regularly rerun until 2014.

Home media 
In 2001, Sony Pictures Home Entertainment released episodes from the first season on VHS and DVD. But one format differed from the other in that of the four DVDs released, three were select, individual episodes while the fourth contained the whole season of 13 episodes; the VHS series had only three, separate episodes. Also, there was a difference in the titles of said episodes released on VHS and DVD. The Day of The Dragon VHS box cover art was the same as that of the first season DVD case cover, which featured Jackie, Jade and Uncle with the villains behind them, dimmed in a yellowish background. On these, the episodes were presented without the teasers that originally appeared prior to the opening/intro sequence as they aired. They are currently unavailable and out-of-print, especially since they had limited pressings and no plans have been announced to follow up season one with DVD box sets of the remaining four seasons. However, the entire series can be ordered and seen via video-on-demand service at Amazon and iTunes. As of October 2010, the entire series was made available on the Netflix streaming service.

Sony Pictures Home Entertainment plans to release the second season on DVD through Amazon.com, and other online retailers. Mill Creek Entertainment announced all five seasons on DVD in Region 1.

VHS

United States

United Kingdom

DVD

Reception 
Common Sense Media gave the show 4 out of 5 stars, saying "Lighthearted, entertaining, suspenseful, and humorous, this show may not be deep, but it's a lot of fun".

Other media

Books 
A number of books were released to accompany the series.

Comics 
A number of comics were released to accompany the series.

Video game 
There has only been one Jackie Chan game, Jackie Chan Adventures, first released on Game Boy Advance then re-released on PlayStation 2, both under different titles.

Successors 
Following Jackie Chan Adventures, Chan set off to create local productions in Asia. The first, Jackie Chan's Fantasia, is a 52-episode Chinese animated series produced by Nanjing Hongying Animation Entertainment. It aired in 2009 on CCTV and in English on Sonic-Nickelodeon.

In 2017, Chan announced All New Jackie Chan Adventures, a $6 million 104-episode Chinese CG-animated series produced by Zhejiang Talent Television & Film, Khorgas JJ Culture Media Co., and VJ Animation Studio. It was released in China in 2017, with a feature film scheduled for 2019. Despite the name, it is unrelated to the American series.

Later in 2008 this series was adopted by Sun TV Network in South Indian multiple languages

Notes

References

External links 
 
 

2000 American television series debuts
2005 American television series endings
2000s American animated television series
American children's animated action television series
American children's animated adventure television series
American children's animated comedy television series
American children's animated fantasy television series
Television series by Sony Pictures Television
Animation based on real people
Martial arts television series
English-language television shows
Playmates Toys
Television about magic
The WB original programming
YTV (Canadian TV channel) original programming
Toonami
Cultural depictions of Jackie Chan
Television series about size change
Television shows set in San Francisco
Treasure hunt television series
American television series with live action and animation
Television series by Adelaide Productions
Anime-influenced Western animated television series
Television shows adapted into comics
Television shows adapted into video games
Chinese American television